Population Services International (PSI) is a 501(c)(3) registered nonprofit global health organization with programs targeting malaria, child survival, HIV, and reproductive health. PSI provides products, clinical services and behavior change communications for the health of people in high-need populations.

Programs
Its world headquarters are in Washington, D.C., and its European offices are in Amsterdam. The organization employs more than 250 U.S. staff, more than 150 overseas expatriate staff and 8,000 local PSI affiliate staff. Major donors include the governments of the United States, United Kingdom, Germany and the Netherlands; the Global Fund, United Nations agencies, private foundations, corporations and individuals. It is a member of the U.S. Global Leadership Coalition, a Washington, D.C.-based coalition of over 400 major companies and NGOs that advocates for a larger International Affairs Budget, which funds American diplomatic and development efforts abroad.

Celebrity ambassadors 
PSI works with celebrity ambassadors to raise awareness about the organization's work. Ambassadors have joined PSI staff on international trips to gain a better understanding of PSI's work, testified before Congress to promote increased funding of global health programs, and taken part in many conferences and forums to enhance PSI's visibility. As of 2017, PSI has three celebrity ambassadors: Ashley Judd, Mandy Moore, and Debra Messing.

External reviews 

PSI is one of a select group of charities endorsed by noted philosopher and Princeton Professor Peter Singer as Highly Effective in the fight against extreme poverty.

Charity evaluator GiveWell first reviewed PSI in 2007, again in 2009 and then again in 2011. Initially, GiveWell recommended PSI as one of its top charities. However, in its most recent review, GiveWell states that "The evidence we have seen does not clearly show that PSI has the impact it intends" while at the same time praising PSI for "(a) focusing on programs with proven impact and (b) monitoring whether these programs are implemented effectively."

In 2007 and 2008 PSI was highlighted by Fast Company as a Top Social Capitalist, noting the organization's private sector partnerships with Procter & Gamble and others.

References

Health charities in the United States
International charities
Medical and health organizations based in Washington, D.C.
Charities based in Washington, D.C.
Organizations established in 1970
1970 establishments in Washington, D.C.
501(c)(3) organizations